The Hollywood Hills are a residential neighborhood in the central region of Los Angeles, California.

Geography

The Hollywood Hills straddle the Cahuenga Pass within the Santa Monica Mountains.

The neighborhood touches Studio City, Universal City and Burbank on the north, Griffith Park on the north and east, Los Feliz on the southeast, Hollywood on the south and Hollywood Hills West on the west. It includes Forest Lawn Memorial Park, Mount Sinai Memorial Park Cemetery, the Hollywood Reservoir, the Hollywood Sign, the Hollywood Bowl and the John Anson Ford Theater.

Hollywood Hills is bisected southeast–northwest by US 101. The neighborhood is bounded on the northwest and north by the Los Angeles city line, on the east by a fireroad through Griffith Park, continuing on Western Avenue, on the south by Franklin Avenue and on the west by an irregular line that includes Outpost Drive.

Bedrock of the Hills is a complex association of granitic and metamorphic rock plus interbedded sandstone and shale on which brown loamy soil, often shallow and with abundant stones, has developed.

Hollywood Hills comprises several neighborhoods:

Laurel Canyon
Beachwood Canyon
The Bird Streets
Cahuenga Pass
 Franklin Village
Hollywood Dell
 Hollywood Heights
 Hollywoodland
Outpost Estates
Whitley Heights

Demographics

21,588 people lived in the neighborhood's 7.05 square miles, according to the 2000 U.S. census, averaging 3,063 people per square mile, among the lowest population densities in the city or the county. The population was estimated at 22,988 in 2008. The median age for residents was 37, considered old for the city and the county. The percentages of residents aged 19 to 64 were among the county's highest.

The neighborhood has a diversity index of 0.433, and the percentage of Non-Hispanic Whites is 74.1%. Latinos make up 9.4%, Asians are at 6.7%, African American at 4.6% and others at 5.3%. In 2000, Mexico (7.9%) and the United Kingdom (7.8%) were the most common places of birth for the 22.8% of the residents who were born abroad, which was considered a low percentage of foreign-born when compared with the city or county as a whole.

The median household income in 2008 dollars was $69,277, considered high for the city but about average for the county. The percentage of households earning $125,000 or more was high, compared to the county at large. The average household size of 1.8 people was relatively low. Renters occupied 56.5% of the housing units, and homeowners the rest.

In 2000, there were 270 families headed by single parents, or 6.9%, a rate that was low in both the county and the city.

Arts and culture

The neighborhood of Hollywood Hills includes the Hollywood Bowl and Forest Lawn Memorial Park (Hollywood Hills) as well as three private and two public schools. The neighborhood includes:

 The John Anson Ford Amphitheatre
 A portion of Griffith Park, including Hollywoodland Camp
Mount Sinai Memorial Park Cemetery

Education

In 2000, 54.8% of residents aged 25 and older held a four-year degree, considered high when compared with the city and the county as a whole.

There are five secondary or elementary schools within the neighborhood's boundaries:

 Immaculate Heart High and Middle School, private, 5515 Franklin Avenue
 Valley View Elementary School, LAUSD, 6921 Woodrow Wilson Drive
 The Neilson Academy, private, 2528 Canyon Drive
 Cheremoya Avenue Elementary School, LAUSD, 6017 Franklin Avenue
 The Oaks, private elementary, 6817 Franklin Avenue

The American Film Institute is at 2021 North Western Avenue

Notable people

See also

 Lloyd G. Davies, Los Angeles City Council member, 1943–51, active against gravel extraction in the hills
 P-22, a mountain lion known to reside in the Hollywood Hills

References

 
Hills of California
Mountain ranges of Los Angeles County, California
Santa Monica Mountains
Neighborhoods in Los Angeles
Populated places in the Santa Monica Mountains
Central Los Angeles